Koritnica is a South Slavic place name that may refer to:

Slovenia 
Koritnica (river), a river in northwestern Slovenia, tributary of the Soča
Kal–Koritnica, a village in the Municipality of Bovec, northwestern Slovenia
Koritnica, Krško, a village in the Municipality of Krško, southeastern Slovenia
Koritnica, Tolmin, a village in the Municipality of Tolmin, northwestern Slovenia
Loška Koritnica, a hamlet of Log pod Mangartom, a village in the Municipality of Bovec, northwestern Slovenia

Serbia 
Donja Koritnica, a village in the Municipality of Bela Palanka
Gornja Koritnica, a village in the Municipality of Bela Palanka